= Lhunshigyia Monastery =

Buddhist monastery in Qinghai, China

Religion
- Affiliation: Tibetan Buddhism

Location
- Location: Qinghai, China
- Country: India

Lhunshigyia Monastery is a Buddhist monastery in Qinghai, China.
